The 1991 Swedish Golf Tour, known as the Lancôme Tour for sponsorship reasons, was the sixth season of the Swedish Golf Tour, a series of professional golf tournaments for women held in Sweden.

No single player won more than one title this season, while Marie Wennersten-From won her second Order of Merit following one victory and four runner-up finishes.

Schedule
The season consisted of 10 tournaments played between May and August, where one event was included on the 1991 Ladies European Tour.

Order of Merit

Source:

See also
1991 Swedish Golf Tour (men's tour)

References

External links
Official homepage of the Swedish Golf Tour

Swedish Golf Tour (women)
Swedish Golf Tour (women)